Denis M. MacEoin (26 January 1949 – 6 June 2022) was a British academic, scholar and writer with a focus on Persian, Arabic and Islamic studies. He authored several academic books and articles, as well as many pieces of journalism. Since 2014 he published a number of essays on current events with a Middle Eastern focus at the Gatestone Institute, of which he was a Senior Fellow. He was a Senior Editor from 2009 to 2010 at Middle East Quarterly, a publication of the American think tank Middle East Forum, where he was also a Fellow.

From 2006-2015 MacEoin wrote a blog entitled A Liberal Defence of Israel, "designed to correct the false impression that Israel is an illiberal, fascist, or apartheid state." In 2007 he authored a report entitled The Hijacking of British Islam, which garnered considerable criticism labelling him as a neo-conservative and accusations of forgery.

As a novelist, MacEoin wrote under the pen names Daniel Easterman and Jonathan Aycliffe. MacEoin was a former Baháʼí and wrote in 2009 that he considers himself a secular humanist.

In early June 2022, MacEoin died at 73 due to Coronavirus complications.

Education and academic career
MacEoin was born in Belfast, Northern Ireland. He received a B.A. and M.A. in English Language and Literature at the University of Dublin (Trinity College), an M.A. in Persian, Arabic, and Islamic studies at the University of Edinburgh (1975), and a Ph.D. in Persian and Islamic studies at King's College, Cambridge (1979). 

From 1979 to 1980, he taught English, Islamic Civilization, and Arabic-English translation at Mohammed V University in Fez, Morocco, resigning from the university shortly after commencing employment there. MacEoin claimed the resignation was due to disputes over contract changes, working environment and payment for his services as a Lecturer. He then taught at Newcastle University, but his Saudi sponsors dropped him for teaching "heretical subjects", following which he left academia.

Fellowships
In 1986, he was made Honorary Fellow in the Centre for Islamic and Middle East Studies at Durham University. He was the Royal Literary Fund Fellow, assisting with academic writing at Newcastle University from 2005 to 2008. Since 2014 he has been a senior fellow at the Gatestone Institute.

Scholarship on the Baháʼí Faith 
MacEoin was an active member of the Baháʼí Faith from 1966 to 1980, during which time he lectured and wrote in support of his faith. In the late 1970s he wrote a manuscript on the Bábí movement. As a Baháʼí publishing material on the religion, he was required to submit his material for a Baháʼí review process, and his manuscript was rejected. He resigned from the Bahá'í Faith and later published the material with E.J. Brill as The Sources for Early Bābī Doctrine and History.

MacEoin went on to write critically of the origins of the Baháʼí Faith, and engaged in several years of writing about it, including 18 articles in Encyclopedia Iranica from 1985 to 1990. 

In 1982 and 1983 MacEoin wrote two critical articles in the journal Religion: "The Babi Concept of Holy War", which viewed the origins of the Bábí movement through the lens of jihad, martyrdom, and political struggles; and "From Babism to Bahá'ísm: Problems of Militancy, Quietism, and Conflation in the Construction of a Religion", which continued along the same themes, questioning the number of martyrs and Western re-interpretations of the Bábís. That began a series of public debates in the journal. In 1985 two Baháʼí authors, Afnan and Hatcher, published "Western Islamic Scholarship and Bahá'í Origins" criticising MacEoin's recent articles. MacEoin responded with another article a year later in the same journal, "Bahā'ī fundamentalism and the academic study of the Bābī movement", responding to the criticism. 

Further exchanges in the journal Religion continued. Afnan and Hatcher provided a response that MacEoin tried to discredit them as "outraged fundamentalists", attempted to stigmatise Baháʼí institutions as devious, and attempted to picture MacEoin himself as an objective scholar "persecuted by Baháʼís". MacEoin responded again that, "The real issue is between academic and non-academic approaches to the subject... a believing bacteriologist and mathematician who are trying to defend their religion against what seems to them an attack on its integrity". MacEoin later published "The Crisis in Babi and Bahá'í Studies: Part of a Wider Crisis in Academic Freedom?" in British Society for Middle Eastern Studies.

In 2007, Baháʼí author Moojan Momen wrote "Marginality and Apostasy in the Baha'i Community", in the journal Religion, labelling Denis MacEoin as an "apostate" from the Baháʼí Faith, who "began to write academic papers attacking the Bahá'í Faith", focusing on the Bahá'í Administration. Momen pointed to MacEoin's comparison of the persecution of Baháʼís in Iran to the anti-cult movement in the West as particularly egregious. According to Momen, the attacks from MacEoin continued up to 2005.

Publications

Academic
MacEoin published extensively on Islamic topics, contributing to the Encyclopaedia of Islam, the Oxford Encyclopaedia of Islam in the Modern World, the Encyclopædia Iranica, the Penguin Handbook of Religions, journals, festschrifts, and books, and has himself written a number of academic books.

Christopher Buck wrote: "Rituals in Babism and Baha'ism is a text-centred, information-rich study of the prescriptive passages of Babi and Bahá'í scriptures... [It] is recommended strictly as a sourcebook, so long as the reader is aware that the Babi section is purely documentary and that the Bahá'í chapter treats in a predominantly philological fashion texts and prescriptive practices that are quite unknown to the vast majority of actually-existing Bahá'ís in the world."

 (Report on radicalism in about 80 schools in the UK)

Novels
Since 1986, MacEoin pursued a  career as a novelist, having written 26 novels. He used the pen names Daniel Easterman (international thrillers) and Jonathan Aycliffe (ghost stories).

Daniel Easterman
The Last Assassin (1984)
The Seventh Sanctuary (1987)
The Ninth Buddha (1988)
Brotherhood of the Tomb (1989)
Night of the Seventh Darkness (1991)
The Name of the Beast (1992)
New Jerusalems: Reflections on Islam, Fundamentalism and the Rushdie Affair (1993)
The Judas Testament (1994)
Day of Wrath-Night of the Apocalypse (1995)
The Final Judgement (1996)
K is for Killing (1997) 
Incarnation (1998)
The Jaguar Mask (2000)
Midnight Comes at Noon (2001)
Maroc (2002)
The Sword (2007)
Spear of Destiny (2009)

Jonathan Aycliffe
Naomi's Room (1991)
Whispers in the Dark (1992)
The Vanishment (1993)
The Matrix (1994)
The Lost (1996)
The Talisman (1999)
A Shadow On the Wall (2000)
A Garden Lost in Time (2004)
The Silence of Ghosts (2013)

References

Sources

 

 (archived)

1949 births
2022 deaths
Alumni of King's College, Cambridge
Alumni of the University of Edinburgh
Alumni of Trinity College Dublin
British critics of Islam
British horror writers
British religious writers
Former Bahá'ís
Literary critics from Northern Ireland
Literary critics of English
Male novelists from Northern Ireland
Male non-fiction writers from Northern Ireland
People associated with Durham University
Academic staff of Mohammed V University
Religion academics
Secular humanists
Writers from Belfast